The 2017–18 San Diego Toreros men's basketball team represented the University of San Diego during the 2017–18 NCAA Division I men's basketball season. This was head coach Lamont Smith's third season at San Diego. The Toreros competed in the West Coast Conference and played their home games at the Jenny Craig Pavilion. They finished the season 20–14, 9–9 in WCC play to finish in a three-way tie for fourth place. They lost to BYU in the quarterfinals of the WCC tournament. The Toreros were invited to the CollegeInsider.com Tournament where they defeated Hartford in the first round, in a game referred to as the Riley Wallace Classic, and Portland State in the second round before losing in the quarterfinals to Northern Colorado.

On March 8, 2018, head coach Lamont Smith, who had been placed on administrative leave following an arrest for domestic violence 10 days earlier, resigned as head coach. Assistant coach Sam Scholl took over as acting head coach for the Toreros during the WCC Tournament and the CIT. On April 2, the school announced Scholl would remain the head coach.

Previous season
The Toreros finished the 2016–17 season 13–18, 6–12 in WCC play to finish in seventh place. They lost in the first round of the WCC tournament to Portland.

Offseason

Departures

2017 recruiting class

Roster

Schedule and results

|-
!colspan=12 style=| Exhibition

|-
!colspan=12 style=| Non-conference regular season

|-

|-
!colspan=12 style=| WCC regular season

|-
!colspan=9 style=| WCC tournament
 
|-
!colspan=9 style=| CIT

See also
 2017–18 San Diego Toreros women's basketball team

References

San Diego Toreros men's basketball seasons
San Diego
San Diego Toreros
San Diego Toreros
San Diego